Henry John Peters (September 16, 1924 – January 4, 2015) was an American professional baseball executive who held senior management positions for the Kansas City Athletics, Cleveland Indians and Baltimore Orioles of Major League Baseball between  and . Peters was named The Sporting News Executive of the Year after both pennant-winning seasons.

In addition, as president of the National Association of Professional Baseball Leagues (1972–75), Peters was the chief executive of minor league baseball and helped it survive one of the worst crises in its history.

The native of St. Louis, Missouri, spent more than 40 years in organized baseball.

Early life and education
Peters graduated from Cleveland High School. After high school, he served for three years in the United States Army during World War II in the European Theater of Operations.

Baseball career

Early career
Following his military service, Peters joined the St. Louis Browns after answering a newspaper advertisement, and eventually worked his way into their scouting department. When the Browns left St. Louis for Baltimore after the  season, becoming the Baltimore Orioles, Peters stayed in the Midwest. He spent 1954 as general manager of the Burlington Bees of the Class B Illinois–Indiana–Iowa League, then joined the front office of the Kansas City Athletics, newly transplanted from Philadelphia, in 1955.

Kansas City Athletics
By 1960, Peters was in charge of the Athletics' scouting and minor league system.  In the autumn of that year, Charlie Finley bought the team, and Peters became farm system director of the Cincinnati Reds. But after one season in Cincinnati, Peters returned to the Athletics and Finley, where he would work for the tempestuous owner for four full seasons and hold the title of general manager during the 1965 campaign. Kansas City finished last in 1965, but it possessed at the big-league level (Bert Campaneris, Dick Green and Catfish Hunter) and in its farm system (Sal Bando, Rollie Fingers, Blue Moon Odom, Gene Tenace, Rick Monday, and others) a core of players that—after the franchise moved to Oakland in 1968—would help the A's win three consecutive world championships from 1972 to 1974.

President of minor league baseball
After leaving Finley and the Athletics, Peters joined the Indians as director of player personnel and assistant general manager working under Gabe Paul from 1966 to 1971, but the Indians had only one successful season during that six-year time frame. He then served as the sixth president in the history of the National Association, the umbrella group that governed the minor leagues, during a critical period. The minors had been suffering from over 20 years of plunging attendance, contraction and decline, and were in danger of extinction. The short-season  Northern League folded after the 1971 season, and other circuits like the Class A Carolina and Western Carolinas leagues, the short-season Northwest League and the Rookie-level Pioneer League, then operating with the bare minimum of four teams, were on the verge of collapsing.

"We had so many leagues that were in danger of going out of business," Peters said. His response was to encourage the creation of "co-op" teams that received players from multiple MLB clubs to keep the struggling leagues afloat. "I spent a lot of my time trying to convince Major League Baseball that they really needed these leagues. I’m proud that we were able to create clubs, getting two or three players from this team and a few from another team and so on, so that we could put together an unaffiliated team and each league could have at least four teams. Some of those leagues that were in trouble are now strong and prosperous."

Baltimore Orioles
Peters was appointed executive vice president and general manager of the Baltimore Orioles on November 3, 1975. He succeeded Frank Cashen, who had returned to team owner Jerold Hoffberger's Carling National Breweries, Inc. as its senior vice president of marketing and sales. The challenge that Peters faced was maintaining the Orioles as perennial contenders despite the limited finances of both the ballclub and the brewery and the advent of free agency in MLB which was made possible by the Seitz decision overturning the reserve clause.

During his initial year in Baltimore, Peters executed a pair of blockbuster deals that were influenced by the oncoming free agency following the  campaign. The first happened just before the start of the regular season when Reggie Jackson, Ken Holtzman and minor-league right-handed pitcher Bill Van Bommel were acquired from the Oakland Athletics for Don Baylor, Mike Torrez and Paul Mitchell on April 1. The other came at the trade deadline on June 15 when Holtzman, Doyle Alexander, Grant Jackson, Elrod Hendricks and Jimmy Freeman were sent to the New York Yankees for Rudy May, Dave Pagan, Rick Dempsey, Scott McGregor and Tippy Martinez, the last three becoming part of a nucleus that kept the Orioles as perennial contender for the next decade. Peters augmented that nucleus with a farm system that produced Eddie Murray, Cal Ripken Jr., Rich Dauer, Mike Flanagan, Dennis Martínez, Sammy Stewart, Mike Boddicker and Storm Davis. The Orioles won the American League pennant in 1979 and 1983 and also captured the World Series in the latter year.

Following the 1983 world championship, the Orioles went into decline, and after enduring their first back-to-back losing seasons in three decades, in 1986–87, Peters was fired on October 5, 1987.

Cleveland Indians
Less than a month later, on November 2, 1987, he returned to the Indians as their president and chief operating officer. Although the Indians never compiled a winning record during Peters' four full years in the job, he lay the foundation for the strong Cleveland teams of the 1990s, signing youngsters Jim Thome, Manny Ramírez and Charles Nagy, and trading for Sandy Alomar Jr. and Carlos Baerga. Peters also brought John Hart from Baltimore to the Indians' organization as his hand-picked successor.

Personal
Peters was married to the former Dorothy Kleimeier, with whom he had a daughter and a son, until her death in 2010. He died of complications from a stroke in Boca Raton, Florida on January 4, 2015, aged 90.

External links 

Hank Peters at SABR (Baseball BioProject)

References

2015 deaths
1924 births
United States Army personnel of World War II
Baltimore Orioles executives
Cincinnati Reds executives
Cleveland Indians executives
Kansas City Athletics executives
Major League Baseball farm directors
Major League Baseball general managers
Major League Baseball scouting directors
Major League Baseball team presidents
Minor league baseball executives
St. Louis Browns scouts
Sportspeople from St. Louis
United States Army soldiers